Jepara is a town in the province of Central Java, Indonesia.
Jepara is on the north coast of Java, north-east of Semarang, not far from Mount Muria, with a population of 92,967 in mid 2019. It is also the main town of Jepara Regency, which has a population of about 1,258,000 (in 2019). Jepara is known for the Javanese teak wood carving art as well as the birthplace of Kartini, a pioneer in the area of women's rights for Indonesians.

Demographics
The population of Jepara regency approximately reaches 1.5 million people, 49.86% male and 50.14% female. On the productivity age basis, the considered working-group age (between 15 and 64 yo) dominates Jepara' number population at 67.90%, meanwhile the rest of 25.55% and 6.55% belongs to the children and retired-people group, respectively.

Jepara people is originally rooted as Javanese and religiously speaking, over 98% are Muslim.

The village of Plajan and the village of Tempur have a comparatively multi-religious population.

Economy
Jepara is known for its  furniture industry, notably the teak furniture. The trade has brought considerable prosperity to Jepara, well above the average for Central Java. Since there is a large export trade, the fall in the value of the rupiah against the U.S. dollar and other currencies has probably led to an increase in income for the [furniture makers].

History

People believed to have come from South Yunnan region migrated into the northern tip of Java during a time when Jepara was still separated by the Juwana Strait.

In the 16th century, Jepara was an important port; in early 1513, its king, Yunnus (Pati Unus) led an attack against Portuguese Malacca. His force is said to have been made up of one hundred ships and 5000 men from Jepara and Palembang but was defeated. Between 1518 and 1521 he apparently ruled over Demak. The rule of Ratu ('Queen') Kalinyamat in the latter 16th century was, however, Jepara's most influential. Jepara again attacked Malacca in 1551 this time with Johor but was defeated, and in 1574 besieged Malacca for three months.

It was the site of an English Fort in the 17th century. It is the birthplace of Indonesian national heroine Kartini.

Contemporary Jepara
The population is almost entirely Javanese and over 95% Muslim. As a pesisir ('coastal') area many traders from around the world landed in Jepara centuries ago. As a result, some of Jepara's resident have at part European, Chinese, Arabs, Malay or Bugis ancestry.

The town is renowned its furniture industry. The trade has brought considerable prosperity to Jepara, well above the average for Central Java.

Climate
Jepara has a tropical monsoon climate (Am) with moderate to little rainfall from May to October and heavy to very heavy rainfall from November to April.

Kingdoms
 Kalingga Kingdom
 Kalinyamat Kingdom

Gallery

Notes

References
 
 Blie.Info Places To Go in Jepara

Populated places in Central Java